Bharkuiya is a village in Ujhani Tehsil and Budaun district, Uttar Pradesh, India. Its village code is 128474. It is 13 KM away from Budaun railway station. As per the report of 2011 Census of India, The total population of the village is 1734, where 947 are males and 787 are females. The village is administrated by Gram Panchayat.

References

Villages in Budaun district